Castillo San Cristóbal is a fortress in San Juan, Puerto Rico. It was built by the Spanish to protect against land-based attacks on the city of San Juan. It is part of San Juan National Historic Site.

Castillo San Cristóbal is the largest fortification built by the Spanish in the New World. When it was finished in 1783, it covered about 27 acres of land and partly encircled the city of San Juan. Entry to the city was sealed by San Cristóbal's double gates. After close to a hundred years of relative peace in the area, part of the fortification (about a third) was demolished in 1897 to help ease the flow of traffic in and out of the walled city.

This fortress was built on a hill originally known as the Cerro de la Horca or the Cerro del Quemadero, changed to Cerro de San Cristóbal in celebration of the Spanish victories ejecting English and Dutch interlopers from the island of this name in the Lesser Antilles. At the time, it formed part of the insular territorial glacis of Puerto Rico.

Castillo de San Cristóbal also contains five cisterns that were used for the storage of water during the ages of the Spanish Colony. They are extremely large (24 ft tall, 17 ft wide, and 57 ft long) and were used as bomb shelters during World War II.

Historical timeline

1521 – San Juan founded by Spanish settlers from Caparra.

1539 – Construction of the first fortified defenses at Castillo San Felipe del Morro and La Fortaleza, with batteries aimed at the harbor entrance.

1595 – The English attack San Juan, led by Sir Francis Drake, 25 ships penetrated the line of fire from El Morro. At the end of the battle the English fled taking some prisoners but no treasure, the reason for which they attacked.

1625 – The Dutch attack and take San Juan from the land side. Construction of some form of defense for San Cristóbal Hill was ordered to prevent other attacks from the land side.

1634 – A small triangular redoubt is built on the high ground known as San Cristóbal on the northeast side of San Juan.

1766–1783 - Main period of construction of San Cristóbal as we see it today under the directions of Royal Engineers Tomás O’Daly and Juan Francisco Mestre.

1787 – An earthquake damages the structure of both San Felipe del Morro and San Cristóbal.

1797 – San Cristóbal helps repel the attack on San Juan from the land side by a British invasion force of 7,000 - 13,000 men commanded by Sir Ralph Abercromby. Abercromby's forces, one of the largest ever to invade Spanish territories in America, are halted a mile from San Cristóbal at the Escambrón defenses, also known as San Juan's First Line of Defense; see Fortín de San Gerónimo.

1824 – María de las Mercedes Barbudo, a political activist who was the first female from Puerto Rico "Independentista", meaning that she was the first Puerto Rican woman to become an avid advocate of Puerto Rican Independence, and who joined forces with the Venezuelan government, under the leadership of Simon Bolivar, to lead an insurrection against the Spanish colonial forces in Puerto Rico, and was held captive in the fort pending her exile to Cuba.

1855 – Mutiny by the San Cristóbal artillery brigade against the Spanish crown. The Castillo is held by rebels for 24 hours causing panic in the city when the cannons are turned around and aimed at the city.

1897 – A large segment of 18th-century walls is dynamited from San Cristóbal to the harbor docks to allow San Juan to expand.

1898 – On 10 May 1898, the first shot which marked Puerto Rico's entry into the Spanish–American War was ordered by Captain Ángel Rivero Méndez is against the USS Yale from Castillo San Cristóbal's cannon batteries. San Cristóbal's gunners duel with US Navy warships during a day-long bombardment on 10 May 1898. Six months later Puerto Rico becomes a US territory by terms of the Treaty of Paris which ends the Spanish–American War.

1942 – Still an active military base when the United States entered World War II, concrete pillboxes and an underground bunker control center are added to the ancient defenses of the Castillo San Cristóbal. Cisterns were to be used as fallout shelters.

1949 – San Juan National Historic Site is established as the most impressive structure in the new world.

1961 – The US Army moves out of the forts of Old San Juan, and they become the jurisdiction of the United States National Park Service, to be preserved solely as museums.

1983 – San Juan National Historic Site is declared a World Heritage Site by the United Nations.

La Garita del Diablo

Most of San Juan's fortified walls have guerites (sentry boxes, "garitas" to the locals) at various points. One of the guerites at Castillo San Cristóbal is called "The Devil's Sentry Box" (the "Garita del Diablo"). These guerites offer a vantage point to watchmen guarding the seashore while protecting them. This particular sentry box is one of the oldest parts of the fort, being built in 1634.

There are several legends surrounding the sentry box about soldiers disappearing from inside. However, it is mostly believed – and told so in various local stories – that the only soldier that apparently disappeared was a soldier called Sánchez, who fled his post to escape with his girlfriend, called Dina.

See also

Fuerte de San José

References

External links

National Park Service - San Cristóbal
1898 Sociedad Amigos de la Historia de Puerto Rico
Las Líneas de Defensa de San Juan, Compilación por Johnny Torres Rivera
Las defensas de San Juan 1898, Compilación por Luis M. Iriarte Rota
''The Forts of Old San Juan:Guardians of the Caribbean, a National Park Service Teaching with Historic Places lesson plan

San Juan National Historic Site
Buildings and structures demolished in 1897